Costularia is a plant genus in the family Cyperaceae. It includes four distinct lineages: 
 Costularia s.s. (11 subspecies) from Africa, Madagascar, the Mascarene Islands and Seychelles.
 Chamaedendron Larridon (five subspecies) from New Caledonia.
 a group largely conforming to subgenus, Lophoschoenus (eight subspecies) from New Caledonia and Malesia that are now considered to be part of a redelimited genus Tetraria, which are found on the island of Madagascar.
 the species Xyroschoenus hornei which is endemic to the Seychelles.

List of species
Costularia arundinacea (Sol. ex Vahl) Kük.
Costularia brevifolia Cherm.
Costularia breviseta J.Raynal
Costularia cadetii Larridon 2019
Costularia chamaedendron (Guill.) Kük.
Costularia comosa (C.B.Clarke)
Costularia elongata (Kunth) Kük.
Costularia fragilis (Däniker) Kük.
Costularia hornei (C.B.Clarke) Kük.
Costularia humbertii Bosser
Costularia laxa Cherm.
Costularia leucocarpa (Ridl.) Pfeiff.
Costularia melicoides (Poir.) C.B.Clarke
Costularia melleri (Baker) C.B.Clarke
Costularia microcarpa (Cherm.) Kük.
Costularia neocaledonica (C.B.Clarke) Rendle
Costularia nervosa J.Raynal
Costularia pantopoda (Baker) C.B.Clarke
Costularia pilisepala (Steud.) F.Kern
Costularia pilisepla (Steud.) J. Kern
Costularia pubescens J.Raynal
Costularia purpurea Cherm.
Costularia setacea J.Raynal
Costularia stagnalis (Däniker) Kük.
Costularia sylvestris J.Raynal
Costularia xyridioides (Däniker) Kük.

References 

Cyperaceae
Cyperaceae genera
Flora of Africa
Taxa named by Charles Baron Clarke